Joylord Gumbie (born 25 December 1995) is a Zimbabwean first-class cricketer. He was part of Zimbabwe's squad for the 2014 ICC Under-19 Cricket World Cup. In December 2020, he was selected to play for the Mountaineers in the 2020–21 Logan Cup. In April 2021, he was named as a standby player for Zimbabwe's Test matches against Pakistan. In July 2021, Gumbie was named in Zimbabwe's Test squad for their one-off match against Bangladesh.

References

External links
 

1995 births
Living people
Zimbabwean cricketers
Sportspeople from Harare
Wicket-keepers